Progol is an implementation of inductive logic programming that combines inverse entailment with general-to-specific search through a refinement graph. It was developed by Stephen Muggleton.

Inverse entailment is used with mode declarations to derive the most-specific clause within the mode language which entails a given example. This clause is used to guide a refinement-graph search.

Unlike the searches of Ehud Shapiro's model inference system (MIS) and J. Ross Quinlan's FOIL, Progol's search is efficient and has a provable guarantee of returning a solution having the maximum compression in the search-space. To do so it performs an admissible A*-like search, guided by compression, over clauses which subsume the most specific clause.

Progol deals with noisy data by using a compression measure to trade off the description of errors against the hypothesis description length. Progol allows arbitrary Prolog programs as background knowledge and arbitrary definite clauses as examples. Despite this, benchmarking shows that the efficiency of Progol compares favourably with FOIL.

References

Inductive logic programming
Logic programming languages